Burel may refer to:

 Burel Hill, ice-free hill at Desolation Island, South Shetland Islands, Antarctica
 Burel Valley, Sub-Balkan valley in western Bulgaria
 Clara Burel (born 2001), French tennis player
 Léonce-Henri Burel (1892–1977), French cinematographer
 Burel, a traditional textile originating from Portugal

See also
 Burrel, Albania, city in northern Albania
 Burrell (disambiguation)